Balkan Romani, Balkaniko Romanes, or Balkan Gypsy is a specific non-Vlax dialect of the Romani language, spoken by groups within the Balkans, which include countries such as Albania, Bosnia-Herzegovina, Bulgaria, Greece, Kosovo, North Macedonia, Serbia, Slovenia, Turkey etc. The Balkan Romani language is typically an oral language.

History
Most of the people who speak Balkan Romani are Romani themselves. Another meaning of the prefix rom is someone belonging to the Romani ethnicity. The Romani people are ultimately of Indian origin. Speakers of the Balkan Romani language have constantly migrated throughout the years into all parts of Europe. Since these speakers have migrated to different parts of Europe, new dialects have formed. Although the Romani people originated in India, they are now widespread throughout all of Europe.

Dialects
Balkan dialects, also known as Balkan I, are spoken in Albania, Bulgaria, Greece, Iran, North Macedonia, Moldova, Romania, Serbia, Turkey and Ukraine. This group includes inter alia Arli Romani (Greece, North Macedonia), Sepečides Romani (Greece, Turkey), Ursari Romani (Moldavia, Romania) and Crimean Romani (Ukraine).

Zis dialects, also called Balkan II, are a distinct subdivision within the Balkan group. Bugurdži, Drindari and Kalajdži Romani are spoken in North Macedonia, Kosovo, Serbia and in northern and central Bulgaria.

Elšík uses this classification and dialect examples (geographical information from Matras):

Geographical distribution

Phonology
The sound inventory of Romani does not differ significantly from that of other European languages, most of which belong to the Indo-European family.

The consonant system of Balkan Romani differs in one significant aspect from those of other European languages: it has the aspirated plosives (aspirated stops) characteristic of Indian languages. In the case of Romani, these are the voiceless aspirated plosives /pʰ, tʰ, kʰ/, which in the majority of Romani variants, at least at the beginning of a word, have a semantically distinct function.

Sample

Vocabulary and lexis
Turkish lexical influence is a defining and extremely important part of the Romani dialect in the Balkans. Most of the words however, originate from Persian origin. Loans from Persian, Armenian, and Byzantine Greek make up the pre-European lexicon. Ultimately, it is hard to trace the definite origin of all the words because the words of Balkan Romani originate from many sources and the sources of those languages creates a complex puzzle.

Grammar
Turkish grammar plays a large role in Balkan Romani. The use of Turkish conjugations is widely embedded within Balkan Romani and oftentimes, it is difficult to tell the difference between the grammar of the two languages depending on geography. Balkan Romani has compartmentalized grammar originating from Turkish verbal paradigms along with some Greek influence. Much of the morphology of the language has Greek and Turkish origins, which is why the language is viewed by many professionals as a "mixed" language and thus it is hard to see where one language ends and the other begins. All Romani dialects use Greek derived nominal endings, masculine nouns and loan nouns.

Morphology
The morphology of the Balkan Romani language is again heavily influenced by both the Turkish and Greek languages. Many people view this language as a sort of melting pot because there are so many different influences on it. Turkish and Greek might be the most influential languages on Balkan Romani but other languages, such as Armenian, have also influenced it.  Part of the substrate of Balkan Romani appears to be derived from medieval northern Indian languages.

Writing systems
Balkan Romani has traditionally been an oral language, but recently, there is a growing amount of effort to decode and standardize the language.

Balkan Romani written with Cyrillic script.

Alphabet: 

Romani Alphabet:

Used in most Romani communities.

Notes

References

External links

 "Romani language in Macedonia in the Third Millennium: Progress and Problems", Victor Friedman.
 "The Romani Language in the Republic of Macedonia: Status, Usage and Sociolinguistic Perspectives, Victor Friedman.
The Future of a Language
Good News ROMANI, BALKAN: Ursari People/Language Movie Trailer
Romani language - Lesson 1. Basic Conversation (part 1)
Romani language - Lesson 1. Basic Conversation (part 2)

Romani in Europe
Dialects of Romani
Languages of the Balkans